Robert Dumontois (born 6 August 1941 – 15 June 2022) was a French former rower who competed in the 1960 Summer Olympics and in the 1964 Summer Olympics.

He was born in Lyon in 1941 and rowed for Cercle de l'Aviron de Lyon.

At the 1960 Summer Olympics, he was a crew member of the French boat that won the silver medal in the coxed four event. At the 1961 European Rowing Championships, Dumontois won a bronze medal with the eight. At the inaugural World Rowing Championships in 1962, he won a bronze medal with the eight. At the 1964 Summer Olympics, he finished seventh with the French boat in the eight competition.

References

External links
 

1941 births
Living people
French male rowers
Olympic rowers of France
Rowers at the 1960 Summer Olympics
Rowers at the 1964 Summer Olympics
Olympic silver medalists for France
Olympic medalists in rowing
World Rowing Championships medalists for France
Medalists at the 1960 Summer Olympics
European Rowing Championships medalists
20th-century French people